In geometry, the crossed pentagrammic cupola is one of the nonconvex Johnson solid isomorphs, being topologically identical to the convex pentagonal cupola. It can be obtained as a slice of the great rhombicosidodecahedron or quasirhombicosidodecahedron. As in all cupolae, the base polygon has twice as many edges and vertices as the top; in this case the base polygon is a decagram.

It may be seen as a cupola with a retrograde pentagrammic base, so that the squares and triangles connect across the bases in the opposite way to the pentagrammic cuploid, hence intersecting each other more deeply.

Related polyhedra 

The crossed pentagonal cupola may be seen as a part of the uniform polyhedra known as the nonconvex great rhombicosidodecahedron, great dodecicosidodecahedron, and great rhombidodecahedron.

Various crossed pentagrammic cupolae on the nonconvex great rhombicosidodecahedron may be diminished or gyrated (rotated) to produce a set of 12 polyhedra isomorphic to the Johnson solids J72 to J83. They are the gyrate, metabigyrate, parabigyrate, trigyrate, diminished, metabidiminished, parabidiminished, tridiminished, metagyrate diminished, paragyrate diminished, bigyrate diminished, and gyrate bidiminished quasirhombicosidodecahedra.

Dual polyhedron 
The dual of the crossed pentagrammic cupola has 10 triangular and 5 kite faces:

References 
 Jim McNeill, Relation of Cupolas to Uniform Polyhedra
 Jim McNeill, Cupola OR Semicupola
 Richard Klitzing, Axial-Symmetrical Edge Facetings of Uniform Polyhedra

External links 
 Paper model of this polyhedron by Robert Webb

Prismatoid polyhedra